Hazardia whitneyi, common name Whitney's bristleweed, is a North American species of shrub in the daisy family. It has been found only in the states of Oregon and California in the western United States.

The plant produces numerous flower heads in a dense, elongated array at the top of the plant. Each head contains 8-10 disc flowers but no ray flowers. The species sometimes grows on serpentine soils.

Varieties
Hazardia whitneyi var. discoidea (J.T.Howell) W.D.Clark - no ray flowers - California, Oregon in Klamath Mountains, southern Cascades, and north Coast Ranges
Hazardia whitneyi var. whitneyi  - 5-18 ray flowers per head - California, primarily in Sierra Nevada

References

External links
Photo of herbarium specimen at Missouri Botanical Garden, collected in California in 1866, isotype of Hazardia whitneyi/Aplopappus whitneyi

Flora of Oregon
Flora of California
whitneyi
Plants described in 1868
Flora without expected TNC conservation status